Taman Melodies is a townships located in Johor Bahru, Johor, Malaysia. Taman Melodies is near to Taman Sentosa, Taman Suria and Taman Kebun Teh.

References

Johor Bahru
Townships in Johor